Jeremy Francis Richardson (born 7 September 1963) is a former Scotland international rugby union player.

Early life
Richardson was born on 7 September 1963 in Crawley, England. His father Robert was an officer in the British Army. He studied at Heriot Watt University, graduating in 1986 with a business studies degree.

Rugby Union career

Amateur career

He played club rugby for the Edinburgh Academicals.

Provincial career

He played for Edinburgh District. He was part of the Edinburgh side that won the 1986–87 Scottish Inter-District Championship.

International career

He was capped 6 times by Scotland 'B', the first of which was on 7 February 1987 against France 'B'.

He captained the Scotland 'A' team.

He gained one cap with the Scotland national rugby union team in 1994.

His one full senior international cap was against  at Murrayfield on 19 November 1994.

He played a match for the Barbarians in 1995.

Administrative career

As a committee member of the Barbarians, he organised a match between them and his old club Edinburgh Academicals as part of the Accies 150th year celebrations.

Business career

He founded Cornelian Asset Managers.

References

1963 births
Living people
Alumni of Heriot-Watt University
Edinburgh Academicals rugby union players
Barbarian F.C. players
Scotland international rugby union players
Scotland 'A' international rugby union players
Edinburgh District (rugby union) players
Rugby union players from West Sussex
Scotland 'B' international rugby union players